The 2013 NCAA Division III women's basketball tournament was the 32nd annual tournament hosted by the NCAA to determine the national champion of Division III women's collegiate basketball in the United States.

DePauw defeated Wisconsin–Whitewater in the championship game, 69–51, to claim the Tigers' second Division III national title and first since 2007.

The championship rounds were hosted by Hope College at the DeVos Fieldhouse in Holland, Michigan.

Bracket

Final Four

All-tournament team
 Ellie Pearson, DePauw
 Kate Walker, DePauw
 Cortney Kumerow, Wisconsin–Whitewater
 Marcia Voigt, Amherst
 Danny Rainer, Williams

See also
 2013 NCAA Division I women's basketball tournament
 2013 NCAA Division II women's basketball tournament
 2013 NAIA Division I women's basketball tournament
 2013 NAIA Division II women's basketball tournament
 2013 NCAA Division III men's basketball tournament

References

 
NCAA Division III women's basketball tournament
NCAA Division III women's basketball tournament
DePauw Tigers
Wisconsin–Whitewater Warhawks